The Hirth 3701 is an in-line three-cylinder, two-stroke, carburetted aircraft engine, with optional fuel injection, designed for use on ultralight aircraft and small homebuilts. It is manufactured by Hirth of Germany.

Development

The 3701 features triple Bing 34 mm slide carburetors or optionally fuel injection. The cylinder walls are electrochemically coated with Nikasil. Standard starting is electric start and recoil start is not available as an option. The reduction drive system available is the G-50 gearbox, with reduction ratios of 2.16:1, 2.29:1, 2.59:1, 3.16:1, or 3.65:1.

The engine runs on a 50:1 pre-mix of unleaded 93 octane auto fuel and oil, or optionally 100:1 oil injection.

Variants
3701 high-torque/low-rpm engine
Three-cylinder in-line, two-stroke aircraft engine with three Bing 34 mm slide carburetors or fuel injection. Low piston port timing produces  at 4950 rpm with a very flat torque curve.
3701 high performance engine
Three-cylinder in-line, two stroke aircraft engine with three Bing 34 mm slide carburetors or fuel injection. High piston port timing produces  at 6000 rpm with a steep torque curve.

Applications

Specifications (3701 high performance)

See also

References

External links
 on Archive.org

Hirth aircraft engines
Two-stroke aircraft piston engines
Straight-three engines